Michael W. Feliciano, known by his stage name Roxxxy Andrews (born September 23, 1983), is an American drag performer who came to international attention on the fifth season of RuPaul's Drag Race and the second season of RuPaul's Drag Race All Stars.

Life and career
Feliciano grew up in North Miami Beach, Florida. He is of Puerto Rican and Cuban-American ancestry. He revealed on Drag Race that his mother abandoned him and his sister at a bus stop as a child. He was raised by his grandmother, Sonja, who appeared on a special episode of Drag Race All Stars 2 for a makeover challenge.

Roxxxy is a member of the Haus of Andrews, founded by 1986 Miss Continental winner Tandi Andrews (1964–1995). Roxxxy's drag mother was Erica Andrews (1969–2013). Roxxxy’s drag career began in Orlando at Parliament and Pulse nightclubs and later began competing in the drag pageantry system. Andrews won Miss Continental Plus in 2010.

In November 2012, Logo announced that Feliciano was among 14 drag queens who would be competing on the fifth season of RuPaul's Drag Race. As Roxxxy Andrews, Feliciano won the first main challenge of the season in "RuPaullywood or Bust" and the make-over challenge in "Super Troopers". In the episode "RuPaul Roast", Roxxxy lip-synced  against Alyssa Edwards to Willow Smith's "Whip My Hair". In the lip-sync, Roxxxy pulled off her wig to reveal another wig underneath. RuPaul decided not to eliminate either queen. RuPaul later declared that it was the best lip-sync battle ever. Throughout the series, Roxxxy expressed annoyance at how "comedy queens" who were "unpolished" were winning challenges and not going home, an opinion often directed toward Jinkx Monsoon, which resulted in backlash from viewers. In May 2013, during the reunion Jinkx Monsoon was crowned "America's Next Drag Superstar" while Roxxxy and Alaska Thunderfuck 5000 were declared runners-up.

In June 2016, it was announced that Roxxxy would return to Rupaul's Drag Race for the second season of All Stars. During the first episode, "All Star Talent Show Extravaganza", Andrews became the first contestant in the show's history to win the first challenge on both seasons they appeared in. Andrews also became the first contestant in the show's history to survive being in the bottom five times, making it to the season's finale, and ultimately placing fourth.

Feliciano started drag at Pulse, the gay nightclub where the Orlando nightclub shooting took place on June 12, 2016. Three days later, on June 15, he shared to Instagram a new tattoo that he got in honor of the 49 lives lost and 53 wounded in the shooting. The tattoo is of Pulse's logo with a red heartbeat line drawn through the middle.

In July 2020, he returned to the fifth season of RuPaul's Drag Race All Stars as a Lip-Sync Assassin.

Titles
 Miss Metropolitan Continental Plus 2008, winner
 Miss Gay Florida USofA at Large 2009, second alternate
 Miss West Virginia Continental Plus 2009, winner
 Miss Shining Star Continental Plus 2010, winner
 Miss Continental Plus 2010, winner
 Miss West Virginia Continental 2012, winner
 Miss Gay Southernmost USofA 2015, first alternate
 Miss Angel City Continental 2019, winner

Filmography

Movies

Television

Web series

References

External links
 
 

1981 births
Living people
Hispanic and Latino American drag queens
LGBT people from Florida
LGBT Hispanic and Latino American people
American make-up artists
People from North Miami Beach, Florida
People from Orlando, Florida
Roxxxy Andrews
Roxxxy Andrews